Fallo is a comune and town in the Province of Chieti in the Abruzzo region of Italy.

References

Cities and towns in Abruzzo